The Type 1936A destroyers, also known as the Z23 class, were a group of fifteen destroyers built for the Nazi Germany's Kriegsmarine from 1938 to 1943. They were known to the Allies as the Narvik class. In common with other German destroyers launched after the start of World War II, the Narviks were unnamed, known only by their hull numbers – Z23 to Z39.

Design

In terms of armament, they were closer to light cruisers than the typical destroyer. They were intended to carry two forward guns in a twin turret, but as the twin turrets were not ready in time, early class 1936As carried a single mounted gun forward.

Despite being powerful the ships were not without their flaws. There were problems with the reliability of the high pressure steam engines and seakeeping in rough seas due to the newly designed bow and heavy forward artillery.

The eight ships of the Type 1936A design (Z23 to Z30) were all laid down between 1938 and 1940. The seven destroyers numbered from Z31 to Z39 were classed as Zerstörer 1936A (Mob); they were laid down in 1940 and 1941 and were slightly larger and had some internal modifications (including engines that caused less trouble than with their predecessors) from the original design to shorten construction times.

Description
The ship's hulls were divided into 16 watertight compartments and they were fitted with a double bottom that covered 47% of their length amidships. Their crew consisted of 11–15 officers and 305–20 sailors; when serving as a flagship an additional 4 officers and 19 sailors were assigned.

Armament and sensors

The main armament of the Type 1936A ships was intended to be five 45-calibre  TbtsK C/36 guns in a twin-gun turret forward and the three other guns in single mounts with gun shields aft of the main superstructure, but delivery of the turrets was delayed and all of the Type 36A class was delivered with four single 15 cm guns with one gun forward and three aft. Z28 was the sole exception as its armament was arranged with two single mounts fore and aft. Z23, Z24, Z25 and Z29 were later fitted with the turret. All of the Type 36A (Mob) ships except Z31 were built with the turret and that ship received one later. The single mounts had a range of elevation from −10° to +30° while the guns in the turret could be elevated to 65°. The hand-loaded gun had a maximum rate of fire of 7–8 rounds per minute and the ships carried a total of 480 shells for them.

Their anti-aircraft armament consisted of four 80-calibre  SK C/30 guns in two twin mounts abreast the aft funnel. The mounts were stabilized, but their gyroscopes were undersized and could not cope with sharp turns or heavy rolling. They were also fitted with five to ten fully automatic 65-calibre  C/30 guns in quadruple and single mounts. The gun had an effective rate of fire of about 120 rounds per minute.

The ships carried eight above-water  torpedo tubes in two power-operated mounts. Two reloads were provided for each mount. The standard torpedo for the Type 36B destroyers was the G7a torpedo. They had four depth charge launchers and mine rails could be fitted on the rear deck that had a maximum capacity of 60 mines. 'GHG' (Gruppenhorchgerät) passive hydrophones were fitted to detect submarines and a S-Gerät sonar was also probably fitted. The ships were equipped with a FuMO 24/25 radar set above the bridge.

Ships
The class, including the 36A (Mob), consisted of 15 ships. All were built in Bremen by AG Weser shipyard (part of Deutsche Schiff- und Maschinenbau AG/Deschimag) apart from Z37, Z38 and Z39 which were built by Germania (Kiel).

1936A

1936A (Mob)

Notes

Bibliography

Further reading

 

Destroyer classes
 
 

de:Zerstörer 1936#Unterklasse Zerstörer 1936A